Karin Morisaki is a Japanese Paralympic powerlifter.

Morisaki was diagnosed with a spinal arteriovenous fistula shortly after she was born. The condition caused paraplegia.

2020 Tokyo Summer Paralympics 
Morisaki was charged with lighting the Paralympic flame at the Tokyo Olympic Stadium alongside Yui Kamiji and Shunsuke Uchida.

References 

Living people
Japanese powerlifters
Wheelchair tennis players
Year of birth missing (living people)